"Face of a Hero" is an American television play broadcast on January 1, 1959 as part of the CBS television series, Playhouse 90.  John Frankenheimer was the director and John Houseman the producer. The cast included Jack Lemmon and Rip Torn.

Plot
Prosecutor David Poole is pressured to seek the death penalty for a murder committed by Harold Rutland, the son of a wealthy man. Poole knows that the death was an accident because he was present, but out of sight, at the time and saw that the victim was inebriated and fell from the bluff. In his grief, Rutland falsely confesses to murder. Rather than ruin his own reputation by telling what he saw, Poole proceeds with the prosecution and does so with zeal.

Cast
The cast included the following:

 Jack Lemmon as David Poole
 James Gregory as Leo Fuller
 Rip Torn as Harold Rutland
 William Hansen as Dr. Milliard
 Henry Hull as Victor Bish0p
 Larry Gates as Senator Knox
 Anne Meacham as Catherine Poole
 Whit Bissell as Mayor Chandos
 Malcolm Atterbury as Simon DeGrange
 Charles Aidman as Morrell
 Stanley Adams as Perry Cates
 Byron Foulger as Dr. Spring
 Carol Kelly as Mrs. McDermott
 Leonard Bell as the Defense Attorney
 Burt Reynolds as Gordon
 Florida Friebus as Aunt Louisa
 Jamie Forster as The Judge
 Marilyn Moe as Milly Bishop
 Lois Kimbrell as Miss Grant

Dana Wynter hosted the broadcast.

Production
The program aired on January 1, 1959, on the CBS television series Playhouse 90. John Houseman was the producer and John Frankenheimer the director. Robert L. Joseph wrote the teleplay based on the novel La Face (1956) by Pierre Boulle.

Reception
John P. Shanley of The New York Times called it "a competent dramatization" told in "provocative terms", though the production moved at a pace that "sometimes was too swift." He added that Jack Lemmon gave "a convincing performance".

References

1958 American television episodes
Playhouse 90 (season 3) episodes
1959 television plays